, also known simply as Rikyū, is considered the historical figure with the most profound influence on chanoyu, the Japanese "Way of Tea", particularly the tradition of wabi-cha. He was also the first to emphasize several key aspects of the ceremony, including rustic simplicity, directness of approach and honesty of self. Originating from the Sengoku period and the Azuchi–Momoyama period, these aspects of the tea ceremony persist. Rikyū is known by many names; for consistency, he will be referred to as Rikyū in this article.  

There are three iemoto (sōke), or 'head houses' of the Japanese Way of Tea, that are directly descended from Rikyū: the Omotesenke, Urasenke, and Mushakōjisenke, all three of which are dedicated to passing forward the teachings of their mutual family founder, Rikyū. They are collectively called .

Early life
Rikyū was born in Sakai in present-day Osaka Prefecture. Another major  event of Hideyoshi's that Rikyū played a central role in was the Grand Kitano Tea Ceremony, held by Hideyoshi at the Kitano Tenman-gū in 1587.

This tea room has been designated as a National Treasure. He also developed many implements for tea ceremony, including flower containers, teascoops, and lid rests made of bamboo, and also used everyday objects for tea ceremony, often in novel ways.

Raku teabowls were originated through his collaboration with a tile-maker named Raku Chōjirō. Rikyū had a preference for simple, rustic items made in Japan, rather than the expensive Chinese-made items that were fashionable at the time. Though not the inventor of the philosophy of wabi-sabi, which finds beauty in the very simple, Rikyū is among those most responsible for popularizing it, developing it, and incorporating it into tea ceremony. He created a new form of tea ceremony using very simple instruments and surroundings.

A writer and poet, the tea master referred to the ware and its relationship with the tea ceremony, saying, "Though you wipe your hands and brush off the dust and dirt from the vessels, what is the use of all this fuss if the heart is still impure?"

Two of his primary disciples were Nanbō Sōkei (dates unknown), a somewhat legendary Zen priest; and Yamanoue Sōji (1544–90), a townsman of Sakai. Another was Furuta Oribe (1544-1615), who became a celebrated tea master after Rikyū's death. Nanbō is credited as the original author of the Nanpō roku, a record of Rikyū's teachings. There is, however, some debate as to whether Nanbō even existed, and some scholars theorize that his writings were actually by samurai litterateur Tachibana Jitsuzan (1655-1708), who claimed to have found and transcribed these texts.

Rikyū had a number of children, including a son known in history as Sen Dōan, and daughter known as Okame. This daughter became the bride of Rikyū's second wife's son by a previous marriage, known in history as Sen Shōan.

Rikyū also wrote poetry, and practiced ikebana.flowers for chanoyu are not called ikebana; need verification about him practicing ikebana

One of his favourite gardens was said to be at Chishaku-in in Kyoto.

Death
Although Rikyū had been one of Hideyoshi's closest confidants, because of crucial differences of opinion and because he was too independent, Hideyoshi ordered him to commit ritual suicide. One year earlier after the Siege of Odawara (1590), his famous disciple Yamanoue Sōji was tortured and decapitated on Hideyoshi's orders. The turning point is that after the completion of the Sanmon gate(金毛閣）, in the offering written by the National Teacher Taihō Enkannational Shunoku Sōen（春屋宗園） at the request of Rikyū, thousands of households opent their door at once said this sentence , which angered Hideyoshi. While Hideyoshi's reason may never be known for certain, it is known that Rikyū committed seppuku at his residence within Hideyoshi's Jurakudai palace in Kyoto in 1591 on the 28th day of the 2nd month (of the traditional Japanese lunar calendar; or April 21 when calculated according to the modern Gregorian calendar), at the age of seventy.

According to Okakura Kakuzō in The Book of Tea, Rikyū's last act was to hold an exquisite tea ceremony. After serving all his guests, he presented each piece of the tea-equipage for their inspection, along with an exquisite kakemono, which Okakura described as "a wonderful writing by an ancient monk dealing with the evanescence of all things". Rikyū presented each of his guests with a piece of the equipment as a souvenir, with the exception of the bowl, which he shattered, as he uttered the words: "Never again shall this cup, polluted by the lips of misfortune, be used by man." As the guests departed, one remained to serve as witness to Rikyū's death. Rikyū's last words, which he wrote down as a death poem, were in verse, addressed to the dagger with which he took his own life:

When Hideyoshi was building his lavish residence at Fushimi the following year, he remarked that he wished its construction and decoration to be pleasing to Rikyū. Hideyoshi was known for his temper, and is said to have expressed regret at his treatment of Rikyū.

Rikyū's grave is located at Jukōin temple in the Daitoku-ji compound in Kyoto; his posthumous Buddhist name is Fushin'an Rikyū Sōeki Koji.

Memorials for Rikyū are observed annually by many schools of Japanese tea ceremony.  The Omotesenke school's annual memorial takes place at the family's headquarters each year on March 27, and the Urasenke school's takes place at its own family's headquarters each year on March 28. The three Sen families (Omotesenke, Urasenke, Mushakōjisenke) take turns holding a memorial service on the 28th of every month, at their mutual family temple, the subsidiary temple Jukōin at Daitoku-ji temple.

Rikyū's Seven High-Status Disciples
The  ('Seven Foremost Disciples', 'Seven Luminaries') is a set of seven high-ranking daimyō or generals who were also direct disciples of Sen no Rikyū: Maeda Toshinaga, Gamō Ujisato, Hosokawa Tadaoki, Furuta Oribe, Makimura Toshisada, Dom Justo Takayama, and Shimayama Munetsuna. The seven-member set was first mentioned by Rikyū's grandson Sen no Sōtan. In a 1663 list given by Sōtan's son (and fourth-generation head of the Sen Sōsa lineage of tea masters), Maeda Toshinaga is replaced by Seta Masatada.

In popular culture 
Rikyu (1989) is Hiroshi Teshigahara's film about the master. The film focuses on the late stages of life of Rikyū, during the highly turbulent Sengoku period of feudal Japan. The film won a number of awards. 

Death of a Tea Master (also known as : Honkakubo's Student Writings) is a 1989 biographical drama film directed by Kei Kumai with Toshiro Mifune as the lead character. It is based on the events surrounding his ritual suicide. It was entered into the main competition at the 43rd Venice International Film Festival, in which it won the Silver Lion.

Hyouge Mono is a manga written and illustrated by Yoshihiro Yamada.  is a fictional retelling of the era in which Sen no Rikyū lived, and how close tea culture was to the world of politics. It won several comic awards and was adapted into an anime series in 2011. 

 was made in 2013 by Mitsutoshi Tanaka, starring kabuki actor Ichikawa Ebizō XI, Rei Dan, Akira Emoto, and Seiji Fukushi. It is based on a novel by Kenichi Yamamoto.

Sen no Rikyū is a character in the Sengoku Basara franchise, introduced in the 2015 game Sengoku Basara 4. Rikyū is portrayed with two split personalities - the peaceful and elegant Wabisuke, and the irreverent and aggressive Sabisuke – in reference to the philosophy of wabi-sabi that the actual Rikyū popularized. In the game, Rikyū is a former tea master to Toyotomi Hideyoshi, and he is on the run after Hideyoshi ordered him to commit ritual suicide.
 
Sen no Rikyū is one of the main characters in Flower and Sword, a 2017 tragicomical movie by Tetsuo Shinohara. The role of Rikyū is performed by Kōichi Satō.

Sen no Rikyū was added as a playable character to the game Fate/Grand Order in 2022 in the GUDAGUDA 7 event as a 5-star Berserker-class Servant. In Fate/Grand Order, he is illustrated as a female dressed in traditional Japanese clothing with white and grey hair. The Servant's Noble Phantasm animation shows him making tea and serving it to the enemy before dealing damage.

See also
Sen Shōan
Sen Sōtan
Schools of Japanese tea ceremony

Notes

References
 Bodart-Bailey, Beatrice. (1977). Tea and counsel, the political rele of Sen Rikyū.  OCLC 469293854
 Sansom, George Bailey. (1961). A History of Japan: 1334-1615. London: Cresset Press. OCLC 216583509

Further reading
 Tanaka, Seno, Tanaka, Sendo, Reischauer, Edwin O. “The Tea Ceremony”,  Kodansha International; Revised edition, May 1, 2000. , .

External links 

 
Momoyama, Japanese Art in the Age of Grandeur, an exhibition catalog from The Metropolitan Museum of Art (fully available online as PDF), which contains material on Sen no Rikyū 
Turning point : Oribe and the arts of sixteenth-century Japan, an exhibition catalog from The Metropolitan Museum of Art (fully available online as PDF), which contains material on Sen no Rikyū

1522 births
1591 deaths
Chadō
Japanese tea masters
Suicides by seppuku
People from Sakai, Osaka
Forced suicides
16th-century suicides